The 2020–21 Buildbase FA Vase was the 47th season of the FA Vase, an annual football competition for teams playing in Levels 9 and 10 (steps 5 & 6) of the English National League System. The competition was played with two qualifying rounds followed by six proper rounds, semi-finals, and the final played at Wembley Stadium. All ties this season were played to a finish on the day. For this season there were no replays  in any of the rounds  to minimise fixture congestion due to late start of the football season brought about by the COVID-19 pandemic. If games finished level after 90 minutes, the match was decided by penalties to find the winner of the tie, apart from the Final where there were 30 minutes extra time (15 minutes each way) followed by penalties if still level after the extra time period.

Due to UK Government guidelines in relation to COVID-19, the 2020–21 competition's qualifying began before the 2019–20 final was played.

Calendar
The calendar for the 2020–21 Buildbase FA Vase round dates and prize money for the winners and losers of each round announced by English Football Association. All information taken from thefa.com website

First qualifying round
The draw was made on 18 August 2020. Fixtures and match results taken from thefa.com website.

Second qualifying round
The draw was made on 18 August 2020. Fixtures and match results taken from thefa.com website.

First round proper
The draw was made on 12 October 2020. Fixtures and match results taken from thefa.com website.

Second round proper

The draw was made on 2 November 2020. Originally scheduled for 28 November 2020, the Second Round Proper ties were postponed due to the COVID-19 pandemic.

Third round proper
The draw was made on 7 December 2020 with ties scheduled to be played 19 December 2020.

Fourth round proper
The draw was made on 21 December 2020. Originally scheduled for 9 January 2021, the Fourth Round Proper ties were postponed due to the COVID-19 pandemic. On 11 March 2021, it was announced that the ties would take place on 17 April 2021.

Fifth Round Proper
The draw was made on 12 April 2021. Originally scheduled for 6 February 2021, the Fifth Round Proper ties were postponed due to the COVID-19 pandemic. On 11 March 2021, it was announced that the ties would take place on 24 April 2021.

Quarter-finals
The draw was made on 19 April 2021. Originally scheduled for 6 March 2021, the quarter-finals were postponed due to the COVID-19 pandemic. On 11 March 2021, it was announced that the ties would take place on 1 and 8 May 2021.

Semi-finals
The draw was made on 26 April 2021. Originally scheduled for 27 March 2021, the semi-finals were postponed due to the COVID-19 pandemic. On 11 March 2021, it was announced that the ties would take place on 8 and 15 May 2021.

Final
Originally scheduled for 8 May 2021, the Final was postponed due to the COVID-19 pandemic. On 11 March 2021, the date was announced for the tie to take place on Saturday 22 May 2021 at Wembley Stadium.

References

External links 

FA Vase seasons
2020–21 in English football
FA Vase, 2020-21